Ivan Ljubičić defeated Andy Roddick in the final, 7–6(7–3), 7–6(7–5) to win the men's singles tennis title at the 2010 Indian Wells Masters. It was his first Masters title (following three previous runner-up finishes), making him the oldest maiden Masters champion.

Rafael Nadal was the defending champion, but lost to Ljubičić in the semifinals. Until the 2014 Australian Open, this was the last occasion where a player other than the Big Four won a title when each of the Big Four were competing.

Seeds
All seeds receive a bye into the second round.

Draw

Finals

Top half

Section 1

Section 2

Section 3

Section 4

Bottom half

Section 5

Section 6

Section 7

Section 8

Qualifying

Seeds

Qualifiers

Draw

First qualifier

Second qualifier

Third qualifier

Fourth qualifier

Fifth qualifier

Sixth qualifier

Seventh qualifier

Eighth qualifier

Ninth qualifier

Tenth qualifier

Eleventh qualifier

Twelfth qualifier

External links
Main Draw Singles
Qualifying Draw

2010 ATP World Tour
2010 BNP Paribas Open